Alyaksandr Vishnyakow (born 8 May 1986) is a retired Belarusian footballer (forward). He ended his career at the age of 23 due to injuries. His last club was Naftan Novopolotsk.

Honours
BATE Borisov
Belarusian Premier League champion: 2007
Belarusian Cup winner: 2005–06

External links
 
 Player profile on official FC BATE website

1986 births
Living people
Belarusian footballers
FC BATE Borisov players
FC Naftan Novopolotsk players
Association football forwards